Stenocercus ornatus,Girard's whorltail iguana, is a species of lizard of the Tropiduridae family. It is found in Ecuador and Peru.

References

Stenocercus
Reptiles described in 1845
Reptiles of Ecuador
Reptiles of Peru
Taxa named by John Edward Gray